On a Pop Tip Club Chart (also known as RM on a Pop Tip Club Chart) was a weekly chart compiled by British trade paper Music Week. It was published in their RM Dance Update, a supplemental insert, from 1995.

Number-one singles on the RM On a Pop Tip Club Chart

1995
 Real McCoy - "Run Away (Real McCoy song)" (11 February 1995)
 Perfecto Allstarz - "Papa's Got a Brand New Pigbag#Perfecto Allstarz version" (18 February 1995)
 Alex Party - "Don't Give Me Your Life" (4 March 1995) 
 Corona - "Baby Baby" (18 March 1995)
 Strike - "U Sure Do" (15 April 1995)  
 Livin' Joy - "Dreamer" (13 May 1995)
 Donna Summer - "I Feel Love" (12 August 1995)
 N-Trance - "Stayin' Alive" (23 September 1995)
 Corona - "I Don't Wanna Be a Star" (9 December 1995)

1996
 Baby D - "So Pure" (20 January 1996) 
 Gina G - "Ooh Aah... Just a Little Bit" (16 March 1996)
 Josh Wink - "Higher State of Consciousness" (20 July 1996)
 Clock - "Oh, What a Night" (17 August 1996)
 Kim Wilde - "Shame" (14 September 1996)
 Celine Dion - "It's All Coming Back to Me Now" (28 September 1996)
 Michael Jackson - "Stranger in Moscow" (2 November 1996)
 Gina G. - "I Belong to You" (16 November 1996)
 Louise - "One Kiss from Heaven" (23 November 1996)
 Louise - "Naked" (23 November 1996)
 Candy Girls - "I Want Candy" (30 November 1996)
 Spice Girls - "2 Become 1" (14 December 1996)

References

External links
World Radio History article on Music Week
World Radio History article on Record Mirror

European music charts